Küçükotlukbeli is a village in the Otlukbeli District, Erzincan Province, Turkey. It had a population of 51 in 2021.

References 

Villages in Otlukbeli District